Mettavolution is the fifth studio album by Mexican duo Rodrigo y Gabriela. It was released on April 26, 2019 through Rubyworks and ATO Records.

Critical reception
Mettavolution received generally favorable reviews from contemporary music critics. At Metacritic, which assigns a normalised rating out of 100 to reviews from mainstream critics, the album received an average score of 73, based on 6 reviews.

It won the award for Best Contemporary Instrumental Album at the 2020 Grammy Awards.

Track listing

Charts

References

2019 albums
Grammy Award for Best Contemporary Instrumental Album
Rodrigo y Gabriela albums
albums produced by Dave Sardy
ATO Records albums